Sir William Buell Richards  (May 2, 1815 – January 26, 1889) was the first Chief Justice of Canada.

Richards was born in Brockville, Upper Canada, to Stephen Richards and Phoebe Buell. He earned law degree at the St. Lawrence Academy in Potsdam, New York and then articled with his uncle Andrew Norton Buell in Brockville. He was called to the bar in 1837 and continued to practice in Brockville with George Malloch until 1853 and then with his uncle again.

In 1848 Richards was elected to the Legislative Assembly of the Province of Canada for the riding of Leeds, and by 1851 he became the Attorney General for Canada West. Leaving politics in June 1853, he was appointed to the Court of Common Pleas of Canada West and by 1863 he became Chief Justice.

In November 1868 Richards was appointed to Chief Justice of the province which was the highest court in Ontario at that time, the Supreme Court not yet having been created. It was during this time that he heard the appeal of Patrick James Whelan for the murder of Thomas D'Arcy McGee.

With the creation of the Supreme Court of Canada in 1875 Richards was appointed directly to the position of Chief Justice which he stayed at until his retirement on January 10, 1879.

His brother Albert Norton Richards served in the Canadian House of Commons and was Lieutenant-Governor of British Columbia.
His niece Frances Richards painted his official portrait.

See also
 William Buell
 William Buell Jr.

External links 
 Supreme Court of Canada biography
 

1815 births
1889 deaths
Canadian Knights Bachelor
Chief justices of Canada
Justices of the Supreme Court of Canada
Members of the Legislative Assembly of the Province of Canada from Canada West
People from Brockville
Persons of National Historic Significance (Canada)
Attorneys-General of the Province of Canada